Artyom Sokol may refer to:
 Artyom Sokol (Russian footballer) (born 1997)
 Artyom Sokol (Belarusian footballer) (born 1994)